African immigrants to Latin America include citizens and residents of countries in Latin America who were born in, or with recent ancestors from Africa. This excludes descendants of people who were forcibly transported to the Americas through the Atlantic slave trade.

Yale University published a report on the increasing immigration of people from the African continent to countries in Latin America. This report explains this trend in immigration as being due to the stricter border controls and immigration policies by countries across Europe.
This report also cites rises in xenophobic sentiment across Europe as a reason for increased migration of African immigrants from Africa to Latin America. Besides that, another important reason for the increase in the arrival of people from West Africa, especially those from Senegal, in Brazil had to do with the migration opportunities created in 2014 during the FIFA World Cup in Brazil and in 2016 during the Summer Olympics  held in Rio de Janeiro, Brazil.

Brazil is cited as having the largest black population of any country outside of Africa. Brazil's and most of Latin America's friendly immigration policies attract migration from people from the African countries who seek to be integrated into society.

History

During the Portuguese Colonial War and Angolan and Mozambican Civil Wars, some Angolans and Mozambicans  fled to Brazil and became citizens.

After the end of both wars, most migration across the Atlantic to Latin America was from West Africa, often due to political and socioeconomic instability, and a trend toward the tightening of border security in the European Union in the 1990s and first decade of the 21st century. The process of settlement and citizenship acquisition, however, has been eased for these immigrants due to the presence of pre-existing Black diaspora populations in such countries as Brazil, which has minimized local trends towards xenophobia or colorism.

By country

Brazil 

 Brazil - 3000-4000 African immigrants (including 2000 immigrants from Nigeria)

Background

In the period between the late 19th century and the early 20th century, Brazilian immigration policy became restrictive of migration by populations from Africa in an effort to shift the population's racial demographic from being diverse to a white majority one. These policies worked by encouraging migration of people of European descent and making it difficult for people of African descent to enter the country. This same stance was imposed on Asians. These policies differed sharply from policies in the United States that enforced segregation and racial inequality. Brazil's policies were rooted in its history of interracial blending and relationships between the native people of Brazil, Europeans, and Africans.

Puerto Rico 
 Puerto Rico - 2,467

See also
 Emigration from Africa
 African immigration to Europe
 African immigration to Canada
 African immigration to the United States
 Migrants' African routes

References

Afro–Latin American
Immigration to North America
Immigration to South America